The 2022 United States House of Representatives elections in New Mexico were held on November 8, 2022, to elect the three U.S. representatives from the state of New Mexico, one from each of the state's three congressional districts. The elections coincided with the New Mexico gubernatorial election, as well as other elections to the U.S. House of Representatives, elections to the U.S. Senate, and various state and local elections.
The Democratic party gained the 2nd Congressional seat, gaining unitary control of New Mexico's Congressional (House and Senate) delegation for the first time since 2018 and improving the advantage in the House delegation for New Mexico from 2–1 in favor of Democrats to 3–0.

Redistricting

Process 
In New Mexico, legislative and congressional maps must be passed by the state legislature and are subject to a veto by the governor, which would require a two-thirds supermajority in each house of the legislature to override. In April 2021, governor Michelle Lujan Grisham signed a bill passed by the legislature that established the seven-member New Mexico Citizen Redistricting Committee. The job of the committee is to draw three sets of legislative and congressional maps, which it then sends to the legislature for consideration. Current public officials and government employees are barred from serving on the committee. The committee's role is purely advisory and the legislature is free to alter or discard its proposals.

On October 15, 2021, the redistricting committee voted to send 3 congressional maps to the legislature. The first would largely maintain the boundaries of the state's existing map. The second would increase Native American representation in the 3rd congressional district to nearly 20% and Hispanic representation in the 2nd district to 54%. This proposal was championed by the committee's chairman Edward Chávez, former Chief Justice of the New Mexico Supreme Court. The third, drawn by the Center for Civic Policy, would add liberal areas of the city of Albuquerque to the rural 2nd district.

Targeting of the 2nd district 
In the leadup to the 2020 redistricting cycle, some suspected that the Democratic-controlled state legislature might alter the boundaries of the 2nd congressional district to make it more favorable to the Democratic Party. The 2nd district was represented by Democrat Xochitl Torres Small after she defeated Republican Yvette Herrell in the 2018 midterm elections, but she lost to Herrell in a 2020 rematch. The day after Herrell's victory, Democrat Brian Egolf, the Speaker of the New Mexico House of Representatives, pointed out that the 2nd district would inevitably be changed during redistricting and said "we'll have to see what that means for Republican chances to hold it." This statement was criticized by Steve Pearce, the chair of the New Mexico Republican Party, who called it "political tricks."

The district is mostly rural and dominated by the oil and natural gas industry. Carlsbad mayor Dale Janway expressed concern that portions of the Albuquerque suburbs might be added to the district, which would dilute the influence of the rural communities in the district, including Carlsbad. After the 2020 elections, the district held a Partisan Voting Index of R+8.

Legislature's map 
On December 10, the New Mexico Senate voted 25-15 to approve a congressional map drawn by Democratic state senator Joseph Cervantes. This proposal largely resembles the third map submitted by the commission, adding portions of western and southern Albuquerque to the 2nd district and moving a portion of the conservative-leaning, oil-producing area of the 2nd district into the 3rd district. These changes would increase the Hispanic majority in the 2nd district from 51% to 56% and decrease the percentage of Native Americans in the 3rd district from 20% to 16%. Republicans widely opposed the map, with GOP state senator David Gallegos pointing out that the map combines the conservative oilfield town of Hobbs with heavily Democratic Santa Fe, which is hundreds of miles away, and GOP senator Cliff Pirtle claiming that the map represented an attempt by Democrats to control all 3 of New Mexico's House seats. Cervantes defended his map, saying he wished to "reimagine a New Mexico where our districts include rural and urban areas." The New Mexico House of Representatives passed the map on December 12 in a 44-24 vote, and governor Lujan Grisham approved it on December 17.

Dave Wasserman of Cook Political Report interpreted the new map as an attempt by Democrats to target Herrell while still protecting the representative of the 3rd district, Democrat Teresa Leger Fernandez. Under the new map, in the 2020 presidential election, Democrat Joe Biden would have won the 1st district by 14.5%, the 2nd by under 6%, and the 3rd by roughly 11%. Under the previous map, Biden won the first district by 22.8% and the 3rd district by 17.6%, and lost the 2nd district to Republican Donald Trump by 11.8%.

District 1 

The 1st district covers the center of the state, taking in the counties of Torrance, Guadalupe, De Baca, and Lincoln, as well as eastern Bernalillo County and most of Albuquerque. Democrat Deb Haaland, who was re-elected with 58.2% of the vote in 2020, resigned on March 16, 2021 after she was confirmed to become the U.S. Secretary of the Interior. Democrat Melanie Stansbury won the June 1, 2021 special election to finish her term with 60.4% of the vote.

Democratic primary

Candidates

Nominee 
 Melanie Stansbury, incumbent U.S. Representative (2021–present)

Endorsements

Results

Republican primary

Candidates

Nominee 
 Michelle Garcia Holmes, retired police detective, nominee for this district in 2020, and candidate in the 2021 special election

Eliminated in primary 
 Louie Sanchez, small business owner

Disqualified 
 Joshua Neal, city planner
 Jacquelyn Reeve, nurse practitioner

Results

General election

Debates and forums

Predictions

Polling

Results

District 2 

The 2nd district encapsulates southern and western New Mexico, including the cities of Las Cruces, Carlsbad, and Alamogordo, as well as the southwestern suburbs of Albuquerque. The incumbent is Republican Yvette Herrell, who was elected with 53.7% of the vote in 2020.

Republican primary

Candidates

Nominee 
 Yvette Herrell, incumbent U.S. Representative (2021–2023)

Results

Democratic primary

Candidates

Nominee 
 Gabe Vasquez, Las Cruces city councilor (2017–2021) and former aide to U.S. Senator Martin Heinrich

Eliminated in primary 
 Darshan Patel, physician

Declined 
Joe Cervantes, state senator (2012–present)
Siah Correa Hemphill, state senator (2020–present) (endorsed Vasquez)
Howie Morales, Lieutenant Governor of New Mexico (2019–present) (running for re-election)

Results

General election

Predictions

Endorsements

Polling
Aggregate polls

Graphical summary

Generic Republican vs. generic Democrat

Results

District 3 

The 3rd district covers the northern and eastern parts of the state, taking in the cities of Santa Fe, Roswell, Farmington, and Clovis, as well as parts of the Navajo Nation. The incumbent is Democrat Teresa Leger Fernandez, who was elected with 58.7% of the vote in 2020.

Democratic primary

Candidates

Nominee 
 Teresa Leger Fernandez, incumbent U.S. Representative (2021–present)

Results

Republican primary

Candidates

Nominee 
 Alexis Martinez Johnson, environmental engineer, rancher, and nominee for this district in 2020

Disqualified 
 Jerald Steve McFall, farmer

Results

General election

Predictions

Endorsements

Polling

Results

Notes 

Partisan clients

References

External links 
Official campaign websites for 1st district candidates
 Michelle Garcia Holmes (R) for Congress
 Jacquelyn Reeve (R) for Congress
 Louie Sanchez (R) for Congress 
 Melanie Stansbury (D) for Congress

Official campaign websites for 2nd district candidates
 Yvette Herrell (R) for Congress
 Darshan Patel (D) for Congress 
 Gabe Vasquez (D) for Congress

Official campaign websites for 3rd district candidates
 Teresa Leger Fernandez (D) for Congress
 Alexis Martinez Johnson (R) for Congress

2022
New Mexico
United States House of Representatives